Humaira is a southwest Asian female name. Notable people with the name include:

 Humaira Abid, Pakistani artist
 Humaira Bachal (born 1988), Pakistani activist
 Humaira Begum (1918–2002), Afghan royal
 Humaira Channa, Pakistani playback singer
 Humaira Hasan, Pakistani diplomat
 Humaira Himu, Bangladeshi actress
 Humaira Khatoon, Pakistani politician

See also

Humera (disambiguation)
Humira, brand name of the medication adalimumab
Himera (disambiguation)

Feminine given names